Roger Kynaston (5 November 1805 – 21 June 1874) was an English first-class cricketer who was Honorary Secretary of Marylebone Cricket Club (MCC) from 1842 to 1858. As a player, Kynaston was active from 1830 to 1854. He played mainly for MCC teams but also represented Middlesex and played for the Gentlemen in the Gentlemen v Players series. A right-handed batsman who never bowled, he is recorded in 166 matches designated first-class, totalling 2,618 runs at the low average of 9.15 with a highest score of 54 and holding 43 catches.

Kynaston was MCC's second Secretary, succeeding Benjamin Aislabie. He tried to improve conditions for cricket's professionals but, according to Pelham Warner, he was "somewhat fussy" and his relationships with the MCC staff were not always good. However, Warner points out that Kynaston held office during "a difficult period" of MCC's history. He was succeeded in 1858 by Alfred Baillie.

References

1805 births
1874 deaths
English cricket administrators
English cricketers
English cricketers of 1826 to 1863
Marylebone Cricket Club cricketers
Middlesex cricketers
Gentlemen cricketers
Secretaries of the Marylebone Cricket Club
North v South cricketers
The Bs cricketers
Married v Single cricketers
Non-international England cricketers
Gentlemen of England cricketers
Burials at Kensal Green Cemetery
Fast v Slow cricketers
Gentlemen of Marylebone Cricket Club cricketers
19th-century British businesspeople
A to K v L to Z cricketers